The Gnowangerup Times  was an English language newspaper published  between 1912 and 1918  in Katanning, Western Australia by the Great Southern Herald publishers,  for the community in Gnowangerup.

History 
The Gnowangerup Times was published from Katanning, with J.F. Cullen as editor and publisher.  It was one of a few local newspapers from the same publisher - the Tambellup Times had a similar publication range of 1912-1924.
Cullen, the editor, had a penchant for editorialising about Australian federal politics, and commented on the state of the parliamentary politics.

See also 
 Gnowangerup Star
 List of newspapers in Australia
 List of newspapers in Western Australia

References

External links

Defunct newspapers published in Western Australia
1912 establishments in Australia
1918 disestablishments in Australia